Fear of the Dark may refer to:
Fear of the dark, a common phobia

Film
 Fear(s) of the Dark, a 2007 French anthology film
 Fear of the Dark (2003 film), a 2003 Canadian horror film starring Jesse James

Literature
 Fear of the Dark (novel), a Doctor Who novel
 Fear of the Dark, a 2006 novel by Walter Mosley
 Fear of the Dark, a 1988 novel by Gar Anthony Haywood which won the Shamus Award

Music
Fear of the Dark (Iron Maiden album) (1992)
 "Fear of the Dark" (song), a song by Iron Maiden
 Fear of the Dark (Gordon Giltrap album)
 "Fear of the Dark", a 1981 song by Scars from Author! Author!

See also
 "Scared of the Dark", a 2017 song by Steps